Shab Mah (also Romanized as Shab Māh) is a village in Bardesareh Rural District, Oshtorinan District, Borujerd County, Lorestan Province, Iran. At the 2006 census, its population was 635, in 138 families.

References 

Towns and villages in Borujerd County